Square or cube watermelons are watermelons grown into the shape of a cube.

Purpose and uses 

Cube watermelons were intended to fit more compactly in fridges and their shape makes them easier to cut as they don't roll. They were invented by graphic designer Tomoyuki Ono in 1978. He presented the watermelons in a gallery in Ginza, Tokyo. He also applied for and received a patent in the United States.

The melons are grown in boxes and take the shape of the container, and they tend to appeal to wealthy or fashionable consumers. In the United States in 2014, some sold for $200.

Although cube melons were originally created with practicality in mind, the cost is prohibitive. The cube shape of the watermelon can only be achieved at the expense of its contents. To retain the proper shape, cube melons must be harvested before they are ripe, rendering them inedible.

Since the advent of the cube watermelon, other watermelon shapes have been introduced, such as hearts and pyramids. They are also available in other countries now, such as in Germany.

See also 
 Bonsai Kitten
 Unusually shaped fruits and vegetables
 Gift economy

References

External links 
 YouTube video depicting square watermelons

Watermelons